Afgooye District is a district in the southeastern Lower Shabelle (Shabeellaha Hoose) region of Somalia. Its capital lies at Afgooye.

References

External links
 Districts of Somalia
 Administrative map of Afgooye District

Districts of Somalia

Lower Shabelle